Lisors is a commune in the Eure department in Normandy in northern France.

Mortemer Abbey is located on the territory of the commune.

Population

Economy and Infrastructure 

There is a public primary school and a butchery in Lisors. The closest train station is 28 km away at Gaillon.

See also
Communes of the Eure department

References

Communes of Eure